The Reason of State (Italian: Della Ragion di Stato) is a work of political philosophy by Italian Jesuit Giovanni Botero. The book first popularised the term Reason of State and became a political 'bestseller', going through 15 Italian editions and translations into Spanish, Latin and French in the late sixteenth and the seventeenth century. Botero's Reason of State was also translated into German as Johannis Boteri Grundlicher Bericht Anordnung guter Polizeien und Regiments (1596). Despite this success on the continent, Botero's Della Ragion di Stato was never published in England. However a little-known contemporary English manuscript translation exists in the British Library. Botero's treatise has been translated into English by P.J. and D.P. Waley with  an introduction by D.P. Waley (London, 1956), and, more recently, by Robert Bireley (Cambridge, 2017).

The expression 'reason of state' denotes a way of thinking that about government that does agree fully with Botero's ideas. It emerged at the end of the fifteenth century and remained prevalent until the eighteenth century. Notwithstanding the criticism of Botero on fully amoral statecraft, it refers to the right of rulers to act in ways that go against the dictates of both natural and positive law with the aim of acquiring, preserving, and augmenting the dominion of the state.

Description 
The book was first published in Venice in 1589, and is most notable for criticizing methods of statecraft associated with Niccolò Machiavelli and presenting economics as an aspect of politics. In the dedication of the 1589 edition of The Reason of State, Botero states his determined opposition to machiavellism. He traces the corruption of 16th century political discourse to the ideas advanced by Machiavelli. However, Botero does adopt aspects of Machiavelli's thought in The Reason of State. For instance, in 1590 Botero added a chapter to The Reason of State that advocates all European states join the Republic of Venice in a campaign to oust the Ottoman Empire from Europe. This appeal mirrors Machiavelli's own call to drive all foreigners out of Italy at the end of The Prince. Botero also expands upon Machiavelli's premise that men, not money, are more important for preserving a viable political regime. Where for Machiavelli men are crucial for their military valor, Botero proclaims that both a regime's population and its martial abilities are the most crucial resources at a ruler's disposal.

The Reason of State
Among the reasons that Botero put forward for writing his Della ragion di Stato, Botero refers to the popularity of (oral) discussions of reason of state in the European courts. While in France and Italy Botero noted that the term "reason of state" was frequently associated with Niccolò Machiavelli's political thought. By deciding to take part in these and other discussions, Botero uses a written and published form to retrieve the topic of reason of state from secrecy. Botero is the first promoter of a ‘good’ reason of state in which statesmen are responsible before their conscience. He impugns any notion of the reason of State that would be based on immorality, that is on constant transgression of God's prescriptions. The most significant point of departure from Machiavelli's intellectual 'shadow' concerns Botero's warm embrace and strong support of Christianity and the Roman Catholic Church in particular:

Botero and Religious Toleration
In essence, Botero asserts that piety, religion and Roman Catholicism are indispensable parts of any reason of state approach to governing.

Botero considers Roman Catholicism to be the foundation of virtuous behavior. He perceives Islam and the Protestant branch of Christianity as a threat to both the survival of Roman Catholicism and good governance in Europe.  In The Reason of State, Botero connects a political regime's religious heterogeneity with civil unrest and civil war. He suggests that Christian rulers disincentivize the growth of new religions and religious branches by levying special taxes upon religious dissenters and prohibiting these dissenters from speaking or assembling freely or bearing arms.  In extreme cases, Botero advocates that Christian rulers relocate entire populations of religious dissenters. Botero advocates that Christian monarchs implement policies similar to those adopted by the Ottoman Empire against religious minorities and by the Assyrian Empire against the Jewish people.

Botero on Demography
In addition to his main work Botero composed a special treatise Delle Cause della Grandezza della Città (On the Causes of the Greatness of Cities), published in 1589 as an appendix to The Reason of State.  This is a very remarkable treatise. The causes to which Botero ascribes the increase of cities are mostly identical with those mentioned by Seneca, the influence of each being traced and estimated. But the work is principally worthy of notice from its showing that the author was fully master of all that is really true in the theory of Malthus. This is particularly evinced in his reasonings to show that colonies do not depopulate the mother countries, and in his investigation of the circumstances which limit and determine the growth of cities.

Notes

Bibliography 

 Luigi Pozzi, La "Ragion di Stato" e le "Relazioni universali" di Giovanni Botero, Casale 1881.
 Mario Attilio Levi, Della Ragion di Stato di Giovanni Botero, in Annali dell'Istituto superiore di Magistero del Piemonte, I (1927), pp. 1–21.
 Rodolfo De Mattei, Critiche secentesche alla "Ragion di Stato" del Botero, in Studi di storia e diritto in onore di A. Solmi, Milano 1941, II, pp. 325–342.
 Rodolfo De Mattei, Origini e fortuna della locuzione "ragion di Stato", in Studi in memoria di F. Ferrara, Milano 1943, I, pp. 177–192.
 Emil A. Fischer, Giovanni Botero ein politischer und volkswirtschaftlicher Denker der Gegenreformation, Langnau (Bern) 1952.
 Federico Chabod, Giovanni Botero (1934), ora in Id., Scritti sul Rinascimento, Torino 1967, pp. 271–458 (da segnalare la preziosa appendice con l'esemplare analisi delle fonti delle Relazioni universali).
 Friedrich Meinecke, Die Idee der Staatsräson, in der neueren Geschichte, München-Berlin 1924 (trad. it. L'idea della ragion di Stato nella storia moderna, Firenze 1970), pp. 65–70.
 Luigi Firpo, La "Ragion di Stato" di Giovanni Botero: redazione, rifacimenti, fortuna, in Civiltà del Piemonte. Studi in onore di Renzo Gandolfo nel suo settantacinquesimo compleanno, a cura di Gianrenzo P. Clivio, Riccardo Massano, Torino 1975, pp. 139–64.
 Botero e la "Ragion di Stato", Atti del Convegno in memoria di Luigi Firpo, Torino (8-10 marzo 1990), a cura di Artemio Enzo Baldini, Firenze 1992 (in partic. A. Tenenti, Dalla "Ragion di Stato" di Machiavelli a quella di Botero, pp. 11–21; K.C. Schellhase, Botero, reason of State, and Tacitus, pp. 243–58; M. Stolleis, Zur Rezeption von Giovanni Botero in Deutschland, pp. 405–16).

External links 
 
 

1589 books
Political philosophy literature
Books in political philosophy
Political books
Treatises